K. K. N. Kurup (born 1939) is an historian of India and a former vice-chancellor of the University of Calicut. He has specialised in the history of the Malabar region of South India.

Kurup obtained a B.A. from the University of Delhi and then studied for his M.A. and PhD at the University of Calicut. He was awarded the latter in 1976. He had been teaching at Calicut since 1972 and continued in various positions there. In 1983, he was a professor and the head of the history department at the University of Mangalore and was also awarded a professorship at Calicut. He was appointed head of the history department in Calicut in 1991 and in June 1998 became vice-chancellor, at a time when the university was suffering from a decline in staff due to numerous retirements. During his period of office, the fortunes of the institution were revived, its student numbers increased, a new engineering college facility was introduced and tertiary facilities were established in Thrissur, Wayanad and Vatakara. The tertiary bodies were all situated in relatively remote areas and formed part of his "Knowledge for Villages" vision.

The Malabar Institute of Research and Development is another Kurup innovation, begun at Vatakara in 2002 while he was still vice-chancellor. He was able to devote more time to it after his term of office came to an end in June of that year and now describes it as 

Kurup is a senior research fellow of the Indian Council of Historical Research. He specialises in agrarian relations, colonial history and folklore, especially in the region of Kerala, which used to be a part of Malabar. He was general president of the 1991 South Indian History Congress at Dharwad and president of the Modern Session at the Indian History Congress held in Mysore in 1993. Among his numerous other offices has been that of director-general of the Centre for Heritage Studies operated by the Government of Kerala.

Various awards have been made to Kurup, including the 2010 T. K. Ramakrishnan Prize awarded by Abu Dhabi Sakthi Theatres. and the 1981 K. Damodaran award for the best work in Malayalam on a social science topic
and Annahda national excellence award in 2019.

Works 
Kurup has published numerous works in both English and Malayalam. These encompass research papers and books, of which the latter include:

 (editor)

Documentary appearances

References 

Living people
1939 births
Historians of India
20th-century Indian historians
Academic staff of the University of Calicut
Delhi University alumni
Indian folklorists
University of Calicut alumni
Scholars from Kerala
Recipients of the Abu Dhabi Sakthi Award